Glaceau Smartwater (stylized as smartwater) is a brand of bottled water owned by Energy Brands, a subsidiary of The Coca-Cola Company. Introduced in 1996 in the United States, by 2016 it was one of the top five brands of bottled water in that country with sales worth nearly $830 million in 2017. 

The brand is also available in other countries including the United Kingdom, France, India, Australia, Argentina, Brazil, Chile, The United Arab Emirates, Croatia, Singapore, Serbia, Romania, Malaysia and Canada.

Product

Smartwater is manufactured by the process of distillation. This process removes most inorganic impurities, such as naturally dissolved minerals, but may let low boiling-point organic matter through. Afterwards, certain mineral electrolytes such as potassium, calcium and magnesium are added back. There are no known benefits of distilling potable water combined with the readdition of ingredients lost in this process.

Pack and variants
Globally, the brand has several variants introduced in 2017, such as Glaceau Smartwater Sparkling Green Apple, Lemon, and Berry & Kiwi.  In 2020, four new combination flavors were introduced: Cucumber Lime, Strawberry Blackberry, Pineapple Kiwi, and Watermelon Mint.

Marketing and sponsorship
Starting in 2008, American actress Jennifer Aniston was the ambassador for the brand globally and was involved in a number of campaigns as the face of the product. She was succeeded in 2020 by Israeli actress Gal Gadot.

In June 2022, Zendaya was announced as the global brand ambassador of Glaceau SmartWater and the face of its new campaign "Smart Solutions: Global Water Challenge (GWC)". 

The packaging featured an image of a fantail goldfish; earlier packagings featured an otter.

Smartwater was launched in India through its association with TED Talks India Nayi Soch as the official sponsor for property.

Criticism
In 2018, Smartwater was awarded the German Goldener Windbeutel ("Golden Windbag") anti-award by the consumer rights advocacy group Foodwatch Germany for "the most brazen lie in food advertising" that year. The group said that Smartwater is "nothing but ordinary water" sold by advertising a "scientifically-sounding but completely unnecessary production process" which yields no proven nutritional benefits, for as much as seven times the price of regular water. The product also won the Dutch Gouden Windei ("Golden Windbag") prize that year.

The Coca-Cola Company repudiated the criticism and said that it followed all applicable food labelling regulations in a transparent manner, that Foodwatch had nominated Coca-Cola in order to attract attention to itself, and that "the success of the water with consumers proved that they liked the product for the taste."

References

Bottled water brands
Coca-Cola brands
Mineral water